Achille Majeroni (24 August 1881 – 12 October 1964) was an Italian film actor. 

Born in Syracuse, Sicily, son of Achille Majeroni and his second wife Graziosa Bignetti, he made his stage debut at age twelve with the Marazzi-Diligenti company. He later formed his own company, specializing in Shakespearean works. He appeared in 73 films between 1913 and 1964, notably Fellini's I Vitelloni, in which he played an old comedian.

He died in Rome.

Selected filmography

 The Courier of Moncenisio (1916)
 Figaro and His Great Day (1931)
 La Wally (1932)
 The Last of the Bergeracs (1934)
 Everybody's Woman (1934)
 Loyalty of Love (1934)
 Like the Leaves (1935)
 The Joker King (1935)
 La damigella di Bard (1936)
Music in the Square (1936)
 The Ambassador (1936)
 The Former Mattia Pascal (1937)
 Doctor Antonio (1937)
 Giuseppe Verdi (1938)
 Pride (1938)
 At Your Orders, Madame (1939)
 The Dream of Butterfly (1939)
 Backstage (1939)
 The Night of Tricks (1939)
 The First Woman Who Passes (1940)
 Blood Wedding (1941)
 Caravaggio (1941)
 The Mask of Cesare Borgia (1941)
 The Hero of Venice (1941)
 Stasera niente di nuovo (1942)
 A Garibaldian in the Convent (1942)
 The Gorgon (1942)
 Luisa Sanfelice (1942)
 Lively Teresa (1943)
 Cab Number 13 (1948)
 Mad About Opera (1948)
 Cavalcade of Heroes (1950)
 Messalina (1951)
 I Vitelloni (1953)
 Il viale della speranza (1953)
 The Three Thieves (1954)
 The Conjugal Bed (1963)
 The Ape Woman (1964)

References

External links

1881 births
1964 deaths
Italian male stage actors
Italian male film actors
Italian male silent film actors
People from Syracuse, Sicily
20th-century Italian male actors